Hamilton Township, Ohio, may refer to:
Hamilton Township, Butler County, Ohio, a former township now the city of Hamilton, Ohio
Hamilton Township, Franklin County, Ohio
Hamilton Township, Jackson County, Ohio
Hamilton Township, Lawrence County, Ohio
Hamilton Township, Warren County, Ohio

Ohio township disambiguation pages